Ovadia ben Jacob Sforno (Obadja Sforno, Hebrew: עובדיה ספורנו) was an Italian rabbi, Biblical commentator, philosopher and physician. A member of the Sforno family, he was born in Cesena about 1475 and died in Bologna in 1550.

Biography 
After acquiring in his native town a thorough knowledge of Hebrew, rabbinic literature, mathematics, and philosophy, he went to Rome to study medicine. There his learning won for him a prominent place among scholars; and when Reuchlin was at Rome (1498-1500) and desired to perfect his knowledge of Hebrew literature, Cardinal Domenico Grimani advised him to apply to Obadiah.

Equally high was Obadiah's reputation as a casuist. Meïr Katzenellenbogen consulted him on legal questions, and Joseph Colon invoked his authority. At the request of Israel ben Jehiel Ashkenazi, rabbi of Rome, Obadiah issued a decision in the case of Donina, daughter of Samuel Ẓdarfati, the renowned physician of the pope. About 1525 Obadiah left Rome and led for some time a wandering life. From several letters of that epoch addressed to his brother Hananeel at Bologna it would appear that Obadiah was in poor circumstances. Finally he settled at Bologna, where he founded a yeshiva (school of advanced Jewish studies) which he conducted until his death.

Works 
Obadiah was an indefatigable writer, chiefly in the field of biblical exegesis. The characteristic features of his exegetical work are respect for the literal meaning of the text and a reluctance to entertain mystical interpretations.

He possessed excellent judgment in the selection of explanations from the earlier exegetes, as Rashi, Abraham ibn Ezra, the Rashbam, and Nahmanides, and he very often gives original interpretations which show an extensive philological knowledge.

He wrote the following commentaries: on the Torah (Venice, 1567); on Song of Songs and Ecclesiastes, that on the latter being dedicated to King Henry II of France; on the Psalms (1586); "Mishpaṭ Ẓedeḳ," on Job (ib. 1589); on the books of Jonah, Habakkuk, and Zechariah, published with David ibn Hin's "Likkute Shoshannim" (Amsterdam, 1724). He wrote also "Kavanat ha-Torah," prefixed to the Pentateuch commentary.

Obadiah was active also in the domain of religious philosophy. In a work entitled Or Ammim (Bologna, 1537) he endeavored to combat with biblical arguments the theories of Aristotle on the eternity of matter, on God's omniscience, and on the universality of the soul, as well as various other Aristotelian views that in his view conflicted with religion.

In the introduction Obadiah says that he was induced to write his work by the fact that even so great a man as Maimonides had expressed the opinion that all the theories of Aristotle concerning the sublunary world are absolutely correct. Obadiah himself translated the Or Ammim into Latin and sent it to Henry II of France. It was published in 1548.

See also
Jewish commentaries on the Bible

References

Bibliography
 Saverio Campanini, Un intellettuale ebreo del Rinascimento. 'Ovadyah Sforno e i suoi rapporti con i cristiani, in M.G. Muzzarelli (ed.), Verso l'epilogo di una convivenza. Gli ebrei a Bologna nel XVI secolo, La Giuntina, Firenze 1996, pp. 98–128.
 Saverio Campanini, ‘Ovadyah Sforno un banchiere filosofo ed esegeta, in M. Mengozzi (ed.), Cesena ebraica. Un percorso fra carte e codici, Biblioteca Malatestiana, Cesena 2019, pp. 103–118.

External links 
 Sforno, Obadiah Ben Jacob
 Short biography of Rabbi Obadiah Sforno

1470s births
1550 deaths
People from Cesena
16th-century Italian rabbis
Bible commentators
Medieval Jewish physicians
Philosophers of Judaism
16th-century Italian physicians
16th-century Italian writers
16th-century male writers
16th-century philosophers